Sharon Hordes was ordained as Reconstructionist Judaism's first cantor in 2002. She earned a Bachelor of Music from the Indiana University Jacobs School of Music. Hordes now serves Keneseth Israel as their cantor.

Hordes was a presenter at the Jewish Reconstructionist Federation convention in 2004.

References

Year of birth missing (living people)
Living people
Hazzans
Women hazzans
American Jews
Jacobs School of Music alumni